Neohydatothrips variabilis, the soybean thrips, is a species of thrips in the family Thripidae. It is found in Central America and North America.

References

Further reading

 
 
 
 
 
 

Thripidae
Articles created by Qbugbot
Insects described in 1896